Anthony Wilson (born May 9, 1968) is an American jazz guitarist, arranger and composer. He is the son of bandleader Gerald Wilson.

Education and career 
Born in Los Angeles on May 9, 1968, Wilson received his degree in music composition from Bennington College. He counts Duke Ellington, Gil Evans, Wes Montgomery, Ry Cooder, and T-Bone Walker among his influences. His first album Anthony Wilson was nominated for a Grammy Award and his second album, Goat Hill Junket (1998) also received praise. Albums with his nine-piece band include Adult Themes (MAMA, 1999) and Power of Nine (Groove Note, 2006). Diana Krall and mandolinist Eva Scow appear on the latter.

He has also recorded two trio albums with Hammond organist Joe Bagg and drummer Mark Ferber, Our Gang in 2001 and Savivity in 2005 (both on Groove Note). In 2009 he recorded more organ trio music with Jack of Hearts (again for Groove Note) featuring Larry Goldings on Hammond organ, and alternating drummers Jim Keltner and Jeff Hamilton.

As a composer, he has received commissions from the International Association for Jazz Education, the Henry Mancini Institute, Jazz at Lincoln Center, the Los Angeles Philharmonic Association, luthier John Monteleone, and the Jazz Coalition Commission Fund. His guitar quartet song cycle "Seasons" was composed as a vehicle for Monteleone's quartet of guitars called "The Four Seasons" which were included in the Metropolitan Museum of Art's 2011 exhibition "Guitar Heroes." "Seasons" was released as an audio CD and live performance film DVD set on Wilson's label Goat Hill Recordings in November 2011. Another 2011 album, recorded in Brazil, was "Campo Belo" (Goat Hill Recordings), featuring rising Brazilian music stars André Mehmari (piano and accordion), Edu Ribeiro (drums), and Guto Wirtti (bass).

Wilson arranged and orchestrated Ivan Lins' song "Love Dance" for Barbra Streisand, on her 2009 album "Love Is the Answer," produced by Diana Krall. Wilson also played guitar on that album.

Wilson can be heard on recordings by Paul McCartney (Kisses on the Bottom, Concord), Willie Nelson (American Standard, Verve), Leon Russell (Life Journey, Blue Note), Aaron Neville (Nature Boy: The Standards Album, Verve), Al Jarreau (Accentuate the Positive, Verve), Mose Allison (The Way of the World, Anti-), Joe Henry (Fuse, Mammoth), Diane Schuur (Midnight, Concord), Gladys Knight (Before Me, Verve), Kenny Burrell (75th Birthday Bash Live!, Blue Note), Randy Crawford and Joe Sample (No Regrets, PRA), Bobby Hutcherson (Wise One, Kind of Blue), Till Brönner (The Good Life, Verve).

He has been a member of Diana Krall's group since 2001, appearing on albums and DVDs, notably the Grammy-winning Live in Paris.

He recorded the album Nova with Brazilian guitarist Chico Pinheiro which was released in Brazil on Pinheiro's label Buriti and in the US on Wilson's label Goat Hill Recordings.

Wilson can also be heard on a number of his father Gerald Wilson's recordings. Since 1986, he has held the guitar chair with the Gerald Wilson Orchestra. Since his father's death in 2014, Wilson has continued the leadership of the Gerald Wilson Orchestra in performances at the SOKA Jazz Festival (2014) and the Playboy Jazz Festival (2015).

Wilson's main guitar is a custom "Radio Flyer" archtop built by luthier John Monteleone; he has also been seen on videos such as "Live in Paris" playing a blond 1958 Gibson Byrdland. Other frequently played guitars include a 1968 Gibson Les Paul Deluxe, and a 1934 Gibson L-30, and a Fender American Vintage series Telecaster with pickups made by Ron Ellis.

Discography
 Anthony Wilson (Mama, 1997)
 Goat Hill Junket (Mama, 1998)
 Adult Themes (Mama, 1999)
 Our Gang (Groove Note, 2001)
 Savivity (Groove Note, 2005)
 Power of Nine (Groove Note, 2006)
 Nova with Chico Pinheiro (Goat Hill, 2008)
 Jack of Hearts (Groove Note, 2009)
 Campo Belo (Goat Hill, 2010)
 Seasons: Live at the Metropolitan Museum of Art (Goat Hill, 2011)
 Frogtown (Goat Hill, 2016)
 Songs and Photographs (Goat Hill, 2018)
 The Plan of Paris (Goat Hill, 2022)

With Jacintha
 Autumn Leaves (Groove Note, 1999)
 Lush Life (Groove Note, 2001)
 Love Flows Like a River (Harmony 2005)
 Jacintha Goes to Hollywood (Groove Note, 2007)

With Diana Krall
 Live in Paris (Verve, 2002)
 The Girl in the Other Room (Verve, 2004)
 Live at the Montreal Jazz Festival (Verve, 2004)
 The Girl in the Other Room (Verve, 2004)
 Christmas Songs (Verve, 2005)
 From This Moment On (Verve, 2006)
 Quiet Nights (Verve, 2009)
 Turn Up the Quiet (Verve, 2017)
 This Dream of You (Verve, 2020)

With Gerald Wilson
 Calafia (Trend, 1985)
 Jenna (Discovery, 1989)
 State Street Sweet (MAMA/Summit, 1995)
 Theme for Monterey (MAMA/Summit, 1998)
 New York, New Sound (Mack Avenue, 2003)
 Monterey Moods (Mack Avenue, 2007)
 Detroit (Mack Avenue, 2009)
 Legacy (Mack Avenue, 2011)

With others
 Mose Allison, The Way of the World (Anti-, 2010)
 Herb Alpert, The Christmas Wish (Herb Alpert Presents 2017)
 Eden Atwood, Waves (Groove Note, 2002)
 Chris Botti, To Love Again (Columbia, 2005)
 Chris Botti, December (Columbia, 2006)
 Till Bronner, The Good Life (Masterworks, 2016)
 Michael Buble, It's Time (143/Reprise 2005)
 Kenny Burrell, 75th Birthday Bash Live! (Blue Note 2007)
 Terri Lyne Carrington, More to Say (E1, 2009)
 Pete Christlieb, For Heaven's Sake (CARS 1999)
 Randy Crawford, Feeling Good (EmArcy 2006)
 Randy Crawford, No Regrets (Wrasse/EmArcy, 2008)
 Lorraine Feather, Cafe Society (Sanctuary, 2003)
 Richard Galliano, Sentimentale (Resonance, 2014)
 Joe Henry, Fuse (Mammoth/Edel 1999)
 Bobby Hutcherson, Wise One (Kind of Blue, 2009)
 Al Jarreau,  Accentuate the Positive (Verve, 2004)
 Norah Jones, ...Featuring (Blue Note 2010)
 Gladys Knight, Before Me (Verve, 2006)
 Paul McCartney, Kisses on the Bottom (Hear Music/MPL, 2012)
 Miranda Sex Garden, Suspiria (Mute, 1993)
 Gaby Moreno & Van Dyke Parks, Spangled! (Nonesuch, 2019)
 Josh Nelson, Let It Go (Omagatoki 2007)
 Josh Nelson, The Sky Remains (Origin, 2017)
 Willie Nelson, American Classic (Blue Note/EMI/Shangri-La, 2009)
 Aaron Neville, Nature Boy (Verve, 2003)
 Vanessa Paradis, Live (Remark, 1994)
 Dave Pike, Bophead (Ubiquity, 1998)
 Leon Russell, Life Journey (Universal, 2014)
 Diane Schuur, Midnight (Concord Jazz, 2003)
 Kandace Springs, Indigo (Blue Note 2018)
 Curtis Stigers, Baby Plays Around (Concord Jazz, 2001)
 Curtis Stigers, Secret Heart (Concord Jazz, 2002)
 Donald Vega, With Respect to Monty (Resonance, 2015)
 Melody Gardot, Sunset in the Blue (Verve/Decca/Universal, 2020)

References

External links 
 Official site

20th-century American guitarists
21st-century American guitarists
American jazz guitarists
American music arrangers
1968 births
Living people
American male guitarists
20th-century American composers
20th-century American male musicians
21st-century American male musicians
American male jazz musicians
Summit Records artists